The 2003 Buffalo Funds - NAIA Men's Division I Basketball Tournament was held from March at Municipal Auditorium in Kansas City, Missouri. The 66th annual NAIA basketball tournament featured 32 teams playing in a single-elimination format. 
The 2003 National Championship game would feature Concordia (CA) and Mountain State. That game would be the 6th championship game to go into overtime (the most recent as of 2009). The Eagles would defeat the Cougars by an overtime score of 88 to 84. The other teams making it to the NAIA national semifinals were Georgetown (KY), and McKendree.

Awards and honors
Leading scorer: Matt Laur, McKendree; in 4 games Laur scored a total of 116 points. Including 48 field goals and 20 free throws. Laur averaged 29.0 points per game.
Leading rebounder: Matt Laur, McKendree; in 4 games Laur earned 49 rebounds averaging 12.3 per game.
Most Three-point Field Goals Made (Individual/Tournament): 21 by Jeremy Groth of Concordia (CA)
Most consecutive tournament appearances: 12th, Georgetown (KY)
Most tournament appearances: Georgetown (KY), 22nd of 28, appearances to the NAIA Tournament.

2003 NAIA bracket

  * denotes overtime.

See also
2003 NAIA Division I women's basketball tournament
2003 NCAA Division I men's basketball tournament
2003 NCAA Division II men's basketball tournament
2003 NCAA Division III men's basketball tournament
2003 NAIA Division II men's basketball tournament

References

NAIA Men's Basketball Championship
Tournament
NAIA Division I men's basketball tournament
NAIA Division I men's basketball tournament